Weasel, in comics may refer to:

Weasel (Marvel Comics)
Weasel (DC Comics), the name of two DC Comics supervillains
Weasel, comic book series by Dave Cooper

See also
Weasel (disambiguation)